Martin Roberts may refer to:
 Martin Roberts (designer) (born 1943), British retail design expert, author and lecturer
 Martin Roberts (rugby union, born 1968) (1968–2016), English rugby union player
 Martin Roberts (rugby union, born 1986), Wales international rugby union footballer
 Martin Roberts (presenter) (born 1963), British television presenter
 Martin Roberts (swimmer) (born 1966), Australian former swimmer
 Martin Roberts (cricketer) (born 1966), English cricketer